Ekdil is a town and a nagar panchayat in Etawah district in the state of Uttar Pradesh, India. This place was established by the Ekdil Khan. It was earlier known as Sarai Rupa. In the 17th century, a eunuch named Ekdil Khan came here, and built a new sarai, which he named Ekdil. At the Time of Mahabharata, Present Day Ekdil was part of Ishtikapuri. It is 9 kilometers from Etawah). It has a small railway station on the north side, 3 kilometers town.It lies between Yamuna At its south around 10km and Ganga river at its North around 50km. It has majority population of 79% of Hindus and compromise approx 21% of Muslims.

In Ekdil Vegetable Market usually occurs on Every Tuesday and Saturday. It is surrounded with around 17 Village which makes it centre to buy daily use Goods Hub for nearby villagers.At Ekdil You may buy Some Good street food, Daily uses Goods and clothes. 

Mr.Saurabh Dixit Son of Great Social Leader Late Shree Rakesh Dixit is currently the Chairperson of Ekdil.

CONNECTIVITY

Ekdil is well connected by Road via NH 2. It lies on northern side of NH 2. One can easily travel for Kanpur, Agra, Delhi, Lucknow via daily UPSRTC Buses. It is connected with EtawahJunction for larger interstate Rail Connectivity. Though it also has a small Railway station of its own but very few train have stoppage here.

Demographics
 India census, Ekdil had a population of 11310. Males constitute 53% of the population and females 47%. Ekdil has an average literacy rate of 55%, lower than the national average of 59.5%: male literacy is 63%, and female literacy is 46%. In Ekdil, 17% of the population is under 6 years of age.

Nearby places
 Bakewar, 12 km
 Bharthana, 14 km
 Ekdil, 0 km
 Etawah, 9 km
 Jaswantnagar, 28 km
 Lakhna, 16 km
 Saifai, 32 km

Trains
 64153 CNB-ETW MEMU	09:12	09:13	Daily	MEMU
 64156	ETW-CNB MEMU	16:34	16:35	Daily	MEMU
 64161	PHD-SKB MEMU	21:10	21:11	Daily	MEMU
 64164	SKB-PHD MEMU	06:52	06:53	Daily	MEMU
 64587	CNB-TDL MEMU	17:16	17:17	Daily	MEMU
 64588	TDL-CNB MEMU	09:08	09:09	Daily	MEMU

Nearest airports
 Gwalior Airport (99.8 kilometers)
 Kanpur Airport (131.0 kilometers)
 Lucknow Chaudhary Charan Singh Airport (178.5 kilometers)
 Delhi Indira Gandhi International Airport (282.2 kilometers)
 Agra Airport (approximately 120 km)

References

2.Ekdil gets first rank in Swachh Sarvekshan 2022   among 437 district of North India 

Cities and towns in Etawah district